Tan Sri Abdul Rahim bin Mohd. Noor (born 6 June 1943) is the fifth Inspector-General of Police of Royal Malaysia Police and served from 16 January 1994 until 7 January 1999.

Born in Serkam, Malacca, Abdul Rahim became Selangor State Police Chief on 21 July 1984 and Deputy Inspector-General of Police on 14 June 1989. He resigned as Inspector-General of Police on 7 January 1999 for punching former Deputy Prime Minister Anwar Ibrahim in the eyes while it's closed on 20 September 1998 while in police custody at the Bukit Aman Headquarter jail.

Rahim was sentenced to two months imprisonment and fined RM2,000 by the Kuala Lumpur Sessions Court on 15 March 2000. His appeal was dismissed by the Kuala Lumpur High Court on 15 December 2000 and the two months imprisonment charge was upheld.

Career
Bukit Aman Administrative Branch Personnel Officer - 9 February 1970
TPP Bukit Aman Administrative Services - 1 December 1973
Supt.  Bukit Aman Administrative Position - 1 October 1975
PP Bukit Aman Administrative Discipline - 18 April 1977
Central Malacca Administrative District Police Chief - 28 December 1977
Training Commander/Police College, Kuala Kubu Bharu - 18 January 1979
Assistant Director of Administration/Management - 1 September 1981
Bukit Aman Special Branch Staff Officer - 3 January 1984
Selangor State Police Chief - 21 July 1984
Sabah Police Commissioner - 27 November 1985
 Director of Bukit Aman Special Branch - 20 January 1986
Deputy Inspector General of Police - 14 June 1989
Inspector General of Police - 16 January 1994 to 7 January 1999

Controversy
On 26 October 2011, while officiating the 2nd Perkasa General Assembly in Setiawangsa, the organisation are known to be far-right in the Malaysian politics. He equated the wave of human rights activism with communism and a new religion. 

Abdul Rahim claimed that some Malay leftist activists as 'wolf in sheep clothing'. Their goal is to make Malaysia a republic. During the ceremony, Abdul Rahim received the 'Perkasa Top Award'. The two previous recipients were former Prime Minister Mahathir Mohamad and former Chief of Malaysian Armed Forces (ATM), Ibrahim Ismail.

Honours
 :
 Officer of the Order of the Defender of the Realm (K.M.N.) (1982)
 Commander of the Order of Loyalty to the Crown of Malaysia (P.S.M.) - Tan Sri (1990)
 Commander of the Order of the Defender of the Realm (P.M.N.) - Tan Sri (1995)
 :
 Companion Class I of the Exalted Order of Malacca (D.M.S.M.) - Datuk (1986)
 :
 Grand Knight of the Order of the Crown of Pahang (S.I.M.P.) - formerly Dato’, now Dato’ Indera (1993)
 :
 Knight Commander of the Order of the Crown of Selangor (D.P.M.S.) - Dato’ (1994)
 :
 Grand Commander of the Order of Kinabalu (S.P.D.K.) - Datuk Seri Panglima (1996)

See also
 Anwar Ibrahim sodomy trials

References

External links
 Reports by BERNAMA on Minda Rakyat Website 

Living people
Malaysian Muslims
Malaysian people of Malay descent
Malaysian police officers
Malaysian police chiefs
Malaysian anti-communists
Malaysian conspiracy theorists
People from Malacca
1943 births
Officers of the Order of the Defender of the Realm
Commanders of the Order of the Defender of the Realm
Commanders of the Order of Loyalty to the Crown of Malaysia
Knights Commander of the Order of the Crown of Selangor
Grand Commanders of the Order of Kinabalu